The 4th congressional district of Tennessee is a congressional district in southern Tennessee. It has been represented by Republican Scott DesJarlais since January 2011.

Current boundaries
The district lies mostly in the southern part of Middle Tennessee, but stretches into East Tennessee.
It is currently composed of the following counties: Bedford, Bledsoe, Franklin, Giles, Grundy, Lawrence, Lincoln, Marion, Meigs, Moore, Rhea, Rutherford, Sequatchie, and the vast majority of Warren.

Characteristics
Most of the district is rural, but many residents live in suburbs of Chattanooga and Nashville. The area is very hilly, and has many well-known geographical features related to its location on the Cumberland Plateau.

This part of Tennessee has several well-recognized distilleries such as Duck River, George Dickel, Southern Pride, and most famously the Jack Daniel's Distillery in Lynchburg.

The region encompasses many of Tennessee's higher education facilities, such as Middle Tennessee State University, Sewanee: The University of the South, and Bryan College.

Recent election results in statewide races 
Results Under Old Lines (2013-2023)

History
Throughout the 20th century, the 4th district took many different forms. Though, in most cases, it encompassed most of the rural area between Nashville and Knoxville.  It has often been the state's largest district in terms of area, and one of the largest east of the Mississippi River, because of low population density and the district's rural character.

For almost thirty years (1947-1977), this area of Tennessee was represented in Congress by Joe L. Evins. (Early in his political career, his district was numbered as the "5th", but that district was almost entirely in what became the 4th after the 1950s round of redistricting.) Evins' successor in Congress was future vice president Al Gore, Jr., who represented the 4th from 1977 to 1983.

The district's current configuration dates from he 1980 census, when Tennessee gained a new congressional seat. Parts of what were previously in the 1st, 2nd, 3rd, 4th, and 6th districts were combined to form a new 4th district.  Most of Gore's territory became the 6th district.

The new district took pieces of traditional heavily Republican East Tennessee and traditionally Democratic Middle Tennessee.  It was so large that it stretched across five of Tennessee's eight television markets (Nashville, Knoxville, Chattanooga, the Tri-Cities, as well as the Tennessee share of the Huntsville, Alabama, market). and five of the state's nine radio markets (the above-mentioned cities, plus Cookeville). This gave congressional races much of the feel of statewide races; candidates' advertising budgets sometimes rivaled those for governor and U.S. Senate. Open-seat races in this district were usually among the most-watched in the country.  However, the district's large size and lack of unifying influences make it very difficult to unseat an incumbent.  Consequently, the district's congressman was usually reckoned as a statewide figure, with a good chance for winning state office in the future.

In 1982, Democrat Jim Cooper, son of former governor Prentice Cooper, defeated Cissy Baker, daughter of Senate Majority Leader Howard Baker. Cooper went on to represent the district until 1995. On paper, this district was not safe for either party, given its volatile demographics. Much of the eastern portion of the district, for instance, had not been represented by a Democrat since before the Civil War. However, Cooper was reelected five times without serious difficulty.

Cooper gave up his seat to run for the U.S. Senate in 1994, but lost to Fred Thompson. Republican Van Hilleary won the seat as part of the massive Republican wave of that year. Hilleary was reelected three times without much difficulty, handily winning a second term even as Bill Clinton carried the district due to Gore's presence as his running mate; Gore represented much of the western portion of the district for his first three terms in the House.

In 2002, Hilleary retired to mount an ultimately unsuccessful bid to become Governor of Tennessee, and was replaced by Democratic state senator Lincoln Davis. Davis held the seat for eight years.

In 2010, Davis was challenged by Republican doctor Scott DesJarlais from South Pittsburg, who rode to victory on the Tea Party wave of 2010 despite Davis raising more money. This marked the first time that an incumbent had been defeated in the district since the reformation of the district in 1982. Indeed, DesJarlais became the first challenger to defeat an incumbent Tennessee congressman in a general election since 1974.

Following the 2010 census, the 4th was made slightly more compact. The district lost its northern portion, including its territory near the Tri-Cities and Knoxville. On the other hand, it gained all of Rutherford County, home of Murfreesboro, and northern Bradley County.

List of members representing the district

See also

Tennessee's congressional districts
List of United States congressional districts

References

Sources 
 

 Congressional Biographical Directory of the United States 1774–present
 Political Graveyard database of Tennessee congressmen

External links
Congress.com: Tennessee Congressional districts
Google map of Tennessee's 4th district at GovTrack.us
National Atlas maps of all congressional districts
U.S. Census data searchable by congressional district
Opensecrets.org Fundraising data from FEC reports
2006 results by county from CBSNews.com

04
Al Gore
1813 establishments in Tennessee